Beecher High School or BHS is a public four-year high school located in Beecher, is a southern suburb of Chicago, Illinois, in the United States. and is part of the Beecher Community Unit School District 200U.

History
Beecher Community Unit School District 200-U is one of the longest surviving school districts in Will County. The high school's location has changed twice since 1954, due to overpopulation in the growing community. Construction began on the current Beecher High School in 2000, barely being completed at the start of the school year on September 4, 2001.

Student demographics and characteristics
The current enrollment at Beecher High School is 679. The ethnic breakdown of the school is 89.6% White, 7% Hispanic/Latino and 3.4% all others. 13.8% of students lie within the low income bracket. The attendance rate is 94%, and the graduation rate is 93.2%.

Academics
BHS offers a wide variety of curriculum for its students to choose from. Departments include Agriculture, Business, Family and Consumer Sciences, Industrial Technology, Media and Technology, English, Foreign Language (Spanish is the only Foreign Language offered after the Class of 2009), Fine Arts, Mathematics, Health and Physical Education, Science, and Social Studies. Beecher offers P courses in US History, English Language and Composition, English Literature and Composition, Chemistry and Calculus AB. Beecher also has a Special Education program.

In 2010, 60% of juniors met or exceeded on the PSAE, 7% higher than the statewide average.

Juniors and seniors also have the opportunity to attend Kankakee Area Career Center located in Bourbonnais, Illinois. Classes take place for half the school day, and is worth 1.5 credits per semester. Departments include Automotive Technology, Business Technology, Child Development, Collision Repair, Computer Technology, Construction Technology, Cosmetology, Drafting/CAD, Fire/Rescue, Health Occupations, Law Enforcement, Precision Metals and Welding Technology.

Issues and controversies

Cyber bullying
BHS made national news in April 2010 when an incident involving hate speech escalated between a Beecher student on the baseball team and a Crete-Monee High School and Peotone High School team member. According to The Huffington Post,

"A racist and threatening Facebook exchange between high school baseball players has some wondering why a threat to lynch another person is not being taken more seriously by two Illinois schools. Crete-Monee High School honor student and pitcher Jihad Yousef was stunned the day after playing a double header against Beecher, when he checked his Facebook page and found a disturbing message from a Peotone player, according to Phil Arvia of the Southtown Star."

References

External links
 
Schools in Will County, Illinois
Public high schools in Illinois